Robert Henry "Bob" Egerton (born 6 March 1963) is a former Australian international rugby union player who won nine caps for the Wallabies in the space of 13 weeks in 1991. His final appearance came in the 1991 Rugby World Cup final at Twickenham, where he played for Australia in her 12–6 victory against England, bringing to an end a short international career.

Early life
Egerton was born in Lae, New Guinea. Robert spent a year overseas in California, playing high school football. As a highly touted 5 Star recruit, receiving numerous Division 1 offers from establishments such as Miami University and the Clemson Tigers, he moved back to Canberra attending Marist College Canberra and studied Agricultural Science at Sydney University (where his uncle was Dean of the Veterinary Faculty) during the 1980s. Egerton played rugby for the university's first grade team over a number of seasons, at fullback, wing, and five-eighth. Characteristically, he wore a long beard. He subsequently studied at Oxford University and played for Oxford University RFC in The Varsity Match in 1987 and 1988.

Representative rugby
In 1991 (now clean-shaven), he (with fellow world cup winner Marty Roebuck) commenced a meteoric rise, representing New South Wales, then the Wallabies, during an unbeaten season. He played on the opposite wing to David Campese (who was nominated Player of the Tournament at the 1991 RWC).

Later career
After the RWC, he was injured playing rugby in the USA. Later, he held various teaching and coaching positions. He worked as a Biology teacher at The King's School, Parramatta, coaching their 1st XV to four premierships. In 2010 he took up the position as Team Manager of the Wallabies. Since 2014, Egerton has been a science teacher at Newington College, where he coached the 1st XV to win the premiership in 2015.

References

External links
 Wallabies Profile
 Bio at Sporting Heroes
 

1963 births
Living people
Australian rugby union players
Australia international rugby union players
Rugby union wings
Staff of Newington College